Harris Academy South Norwood is a city academy in South Norwood, London, for students of both sexes aged 11–18. The school was designated as a Business and Enterprise College by the Department for Education and Skills when it was formerly called Stanley Technical High School. The re-development of the school was finished in November 2007 as part of the renaming. The school belongs to a federation of schools in South London called the Harris Federation named after Philip Harris, Baron Harris of Peckham, the chairman of Carpetright plc. The school is co-educational, changing its status from boys-only which it had been since the school was founded in 1907.
In September 2014, the school amalgamated with Harris Academy Upper Norwood, sharing teachers and a sixth form campus.

Location 
The school is located in South Norwood on both the High Street and South Norwood Hill.

History 
Harris Academy South Norwood is on the site formerly occupied by The Stanley Technical School for Boys which was founded by William Ford Stanley in 1907 as a trade school (initially called Stanley Technical Trade School). Unlike William Stanley who fully paid for the construction of the school that took his name, it is widely believed that Phil Harris actually contributed in cash terms far less than one million pounds to take control and ownership of the state school.

In order to recognise the change and renewal of this school, Phil Harris, Croydon Council and the local community of South Norwood agreed that it should be called the Harris Academy at Stanley. In 2006 Harris changed his mind and unilaterally decided that the school should be called the Harris Academy South Norwood. Until Harris went back on his agreement to protect the heritage and culture of South Norwood with the name 'Harris at Stanley' this school scheme was very popular in the community, unlike in Merton where local parents have been up in arms about the conversion of their local school into a Harris Academy.

Features 
The Harris Academy includes a new sixth form for 300 pupils offering academic and vocational subjects. At a cost of £32,000,000 overall, the facilities consist of:

A new building
Drama facilities
Art and Design studios
Smartboards across all departments

Harris Federation 

The Harris Federation, is a federation of schools in South London. They are all sponsored by the Lord Harris of Peckham, hence the name. The boroughs included are Wandsworth, Lambeth, Southwark, Croydon, Merton and Bromley.

Alumni and staff 

Krept, musician, half of Krept & Konan
Victor Moses, association football player
Stormzy, rapper
Swift, musician and member of Section Boyz
Jamie Webb (staff), international athlete
Captain Sensible, Musician
Waheed Alli, Baron Alli, media entrepreneur and Member of the House of Lords (attended as Stanley Technical College)

References

External links
Harris Academy South Norwood
Harris Federation
Croydon Council

Boys' schools in London
South Norwood
Academies in the London Borough of Croydon
Educational institutions established in 1907
Secondary schools in the London Borough of Croydon
1907 establishments in England